Helen Freeman is a British Reform Jewish rabbi who from 1999 to 2010 was rabbi at West London Synagogue, was its principal rabbi from 2010 to 2020 and is now (jointly with David Mitchell), its senior rabbi. The daughter of a  German-Jewish refugee, she was born in Croydon and was educated at Croydon High School. She was ordained as a rabbi in 1990 and was previously a speech therapist and a Jungian analyst.

References

External links
 Profile on West London Synagogue website
Profile on Cumberland Lodge website

Living people
British Reform rabbis
Clergy from London
People associated with Leo Baeck College
Rabbis from London
West London Synagogue
Year of birth missing (living people)
Jewish Renewal women rabbis